Dennis Carter may refer to:
 Dennis Malone Carter, Irish-American painter
 Dennis H. Carter, Canadian architect and amateur filmmaker

See also
 Dennis Dottin-Carter, American football coach
 Denis Carter, Baron Carter, British agriculturalist and  politician